2. deild karla (English: Men's Second Division) is a football league in Iceland. It is the third division in the Icelandic football league system. The current champions are Afturelding from Mosfellsbær, who won their 1st title in 2018.

The division was started in 1966 as third division with two provisional groups, with number of teams varying from 7 to 10 teams in each group. In 1987 it was decided to merge the two groups to form a single nationwide league with 10 teams so at the end of the 1987 season only three teams from each group would stay in the league, the top teams in each group were promoted, all other teams relegated to the 4th division and two teams promoted from the 4th division. In 1997 after a name change, the division became Second division.

In 2008, as a part of a general change in Icelandic football, the number of teams was increased from 10 to 12.

Current clubs (2022)

History

Championship History 

1966      Selfoss - (Selfoss)
1967      FH - (Hafnarfjörður)
1968      Völsungur - (Húsavík)
1969      Ármann - (Reykjavík)
1970      Þróttur N. - (Neskaupstaður)
1971      Völsungur - (Húsavík)
1972      Þróttur N. - (Neskaupstaður)
1973      ÍBÍ - (Ísafjörður)
1974      Víkingur Ó. - (Ólafsvík)
1975      Þór A. - (Akureyri)
1976       Reynir S. - (Sandgerði)
1977       Fylkir - (Reykjavík)
1978       Selfoss - (Selfoss)
1979       Völsungur - (Húsavík)
1980       Reynir S. - (Sandgerði)
1981      Njarðvík - (Njarðvík)
1982      Víðir - (Garður)
1983      Skallagrímur - (Borgarnes)
1984      Fylkir - (Reykjavík)
1985      Selfoss - (Selfoss)
1986      Leiftur - (Ólafsfjörður)
1987      Fylkir - (Reykjavík)
1988      Stjarnan - (Garðabær)
1989      KS - (Siglufjörður)
1990      Þróttur R. - (Reykjavík)
1991       Leiftur - (Ólafsfjörður)
1992       Tindastóll - (Sauðárkrókur)
1993       Selfoss - (Selfoss)
1994       Skallagrímur - (Borgarnes)
1995       Völsungur - (Húsavík)
1996       Dalvík - (Dalvík)
1997       HK - (Kópavogur)
1998       Víðir - (Garður)
1999       Tindastóll - (Sauðárkrókur)
2000       Þór A. - (Akureyri)
2001       Haukar - (Hafnarfjörður)
2002       HK - (Kópavogur)
2003       Völsungur - (Húsavík)
2004       KS - (Siglufjörður)
2005       Leiknir R. - (Reykjavík)
2006       Fjarðabyggð - (Fjarðabyggð)
2007       Haukar - (Hafnarfjörður)
2008       ÍR - (Reykjavík)
2009       Grótta - (Seltjarnarnes)
2010       Víkingur Ólafsvík - (Ólafsvík)
2011       Tindastóll/Hvöt - (Sauðárkrókur/Blönduós) 
2012       Völsungur - (Húsavík)
2013       HK - (Kópavogur)
2014       Fjarðabyggð - (Fjarðabyggð)
2015       Huginn - (Seyðisfjörður)
2016       ÍR - (Reykjavík)
2017       Njarðvík - (Njarðvík)
2018       Afturelding - (Mosfellsbær)
2019       UMF Leiknir - (Fáskrúðsfjörður)
2020       Kórdrengir - (Reykjavík)* - 2020 tournament was stopped due to the Covid-19 pandemic with two games left.
2021       Þróttur V. - (Vogar)
2022       Njarðvík - (Njarðvík)

External links
 The Icelandic FA
 IcelandFootball.net - List of Third Level Champions. 
 SOCCERWAY - 2.deild summary

 

 
3
Ice
Professional sports leagues in Iceland